BCSC may refer to:
British Cycling
British Columbia Supreme Court
British Columbia Securities Commission
British Council of Shopping Centres
Bachelor's degree in Computer Science, normally abbreviated B.Comp.Sc.
Bartholomew Consolidated School Corporation, the organization that encompasses all schools, elementary, middle and secondary in the Columbus, Indiana, area
Brown Center for Students of Color